This is a timeline of Peruvian history, comprising important legal & territorial changes and political events in Peru and its predecessor states.  To read about the background to these events, see History of Peru.  See also the list of presidents of Peru.

13th century

14th century

15th century

16th century 
1586 St rose of lima was born

17th century

18th century

19th century

20th century

21st century 
{| class="wikitable"
! style="width:6%" | Year || style="width:10%" | Date || Event

|-
| rowspan="2" valign="top" | 2001 || 8 April || 2001 Peruvian general election: Possible Peru won a plurality of APRA.
|-
| 3 June || Peruvian general election, 2001: Toledo won the presidency.
|-
|rowspan="2" valign="top" | 2003 || 26 May || Toledo declared a state of emergency in response to a series of paralyzing strikes.
|-
| 14 July || Birth of Jose Diego Salazar in Trujillo, Peru.
|-
| rowspan="2" valign="top" | 2006 || 9 April || 2006 Peruvian general election: Union for Peru won a plurality of seats in the Congress.  Their presidential candidate, Ollanta Humala, went into a runoff against García.
|-
| 4 June || García won the presidency.
|-
| 2007 || 15 August || 2007 Peru earthquake: A 7.9 earthquake hit Pisco Province.
|-
|2010
|1 
|Peru celebrates Peruvian novelist Mario Varga Llosa's achievement in receiving the Nobel Prize in Literature. 
|-
|2011
|28 July
|Ollanta Humala is inaugurated, winning the presidency over Keiko Fujimori.
|-
|2016
|28 July
|Pedro Pablo Kuczynski is inaugurated as President of Peru, prevailing over former President Alberto Fujimori's daughter, Keiko Fujimori.
|-
|2017
|24 December
|Kuczynski pardons former President Alberto Fujimori, who was sentenced for 25 years with manslaughter, corruption, bribery, and violation of human rights.
|-
|2018
|21 March
|Amidst a political crisis, Pedro Pablo Kuczynski resigns the presidency in the threat of impeachment for corruption and bribery.
First Vice President Martin Vizcarra assumes the presidency until the remainder of Kuczynski's term in 20

See also
 Timeline of Lima history

Further reading

External links
 

 
Peruvian
Peru history-related lists
Years in Peru